Geneseo Township is one of the twenty-one townships of Tama County, Iowa, United States.

History
Geneseo Township was organized in 1856. Its name was chosen by a citizen who hailed from Geneseo, New York.

References

Townships in Tama County, Iowa
Townships in Iowa